AKM Kamruzzaman is a Bangladesh Nationalist Party politician and the former Member of Parliame].

Career
Kamruzzaman was elected to parliament from Comilla-11 as a Bangladesh Nationalist Party candidate in 1991.

References

Bangladesh Nationalist Party politicians
Living people
5th Jatiya Sangsad members
Year of birth missing (living people)
6th Jatiya Sangsad members